is a 1993 film directed by Shūsuke Kaneko. It was distributed by Toho. It stars Yūji Oda and Takeshi Kaga.

References

1993 films
Films directed by Shusuke Kaneko
Films scored by Kow Otani
1990s Japanese films